Lanthanum hydroxide is , a hydroxide of the rare-earth element lanthanum.

Synthesis

Lanthanum hydroxide can be obtained by adding an alkali such as ammonia to aqueous solutions of lanthanum salts such as lanthanum nitrate.  This produces a gel-like precipitate that can then be dried in air. 

Alternatively, it can be produced by hydration reaction (addition of water) to lanthanum oxide.

Characteristics
Lanthanum hydroxide does not react much with alkaline substances, however is slightly soluble in acidic solution. In temperatures above 330 °C it decomposes into lanthanum oxide hydroxide (LaOOH), which upon further heating decomposes into lanthanum oxide:

  LaOOH

2 LaOOH  

Lanthanum hydroxide crystallizes in the hexagonal crystal system. Each lanthanum ion in the crystal structure is surrounded by nine hydroxide ions in a tricapped trigonal prism.

References

External links
 
External MSDS 1 
External MSDS 2
 Lanthanum Oxide MSDS

Lanthanum compounds
Inorganic compounds
Hydroxides